Banner is an unincorporated community in  Floyd County, Kentucky, United States. It was also known as Mouth of Prater.

History
A post office has been in operation at Banner since 1897. The community was named in honor of David Banner, a local settler.

References

Unincorporated communities in Floyd County, Kentucky
Unincorporated communities in Kentucky